Alena Šafářová (born 17 April 1968) is a Czech table tennis player. She competed in the women's singles event at the 1988 Summer Olympics.

References

External links
 

1968 births
Living people
Czech female table tennis players
Olympic table tennis players of Czechoslovakia
Table tennis players at the 1988 Summer Olympics
People from Žďár nad Sázavou
Sportspeople from the Vysočina Region